The Reverend Cyril Shadforth Morton (1885 – 13 July 1947) was a British clergyman and philatelist who signed the Roll of Distinguished Philatelists in 1936.

Morton had an award-winning collection of the stamps of Jamaica.

References

Signatories to the Roll of Distinguished Philatelists
1885 births
1947 deaths
British philatelists